The men's 1500 metres at the 2021 World Athletics U20 Championships will be held at the Kasarani Stadium on 19 and 21 August.

Records

Results

Heats
Qualification: First 4 of each heat (Q) and the 4 fastest times (q) qualified for the final.

Final
The final was held on 21 August at 16:31.

References

1500 metres
1500 metres at the World Athletics U20 Championships